Rich Shapero (born 1948) is an American venture capitalist, self-published novelist, and musician. He is the founder of TooFar Media and the recipient of the 2015 Digital Book World Award for Best Adult Fiction App.

Biography 
Shapero grew up in Los Angeles and attended UC Berkeley where he graduated in 1970 with a degree in English literature. Prior to founding TooFar Media, he was a partner at the venture capital firm Crosspoint and a board member at AristaSoft and New Edge Networks. He lives with his wife and daughters in the Santa Cruz Mountains.

TooFar Media 
Rich Shapero founded TooFar Media in the mid 2000s to produce and distribute his multimedia stories and future works. He collaborates with a team of artists to create his projects, and TooFar Media publishes and distributes them across the United States, the United Kingdom, and Australia.

TooFar Media App

After the founding of TooFar Media, an app was released combining Shapero’s novels with the visual art and accompanying music normally provided on CDs. The stories included in the app are described by TooFar Media as “immersive story experiences" and the TheApp Times says the app “captures the imagination through experiential immersion." The TooFar Media App includes Shapero’s novels and corresponding audio tracks.

Distribution

Shapero’s novels are almost always distributed for free, with the majority being handed out on college campuses. In addition to free distribution the author has coordinated guerilla-style events to promote his works including public dance and improv ensembles, book clubs, and participation in book and arts festivals.

Novels 
Shapero has been self-publishing since 2004, starting with Wild Animus (2004), Too Far (2010), The Hope We Seek (2014), Arms from the Sea (2016), Rin, Tongue and Dorner (2018) and Balcony of Fog (2020).

Wild Animus

Wild Animus was published in 2004. From the author’s website: “Wild Animus tracks the reckless quest of Ransom Altman, a young Berkeley graduate who—roused by his literary heroes and love for his girlfriend, Lindy—resolves to live in a new world of ‘inexhaustible desire.’” The initial idea came to him during his time at Berkeley in the late 60’s and deals with the primal nature of man in pursuit of true self in the Alaskan wilderness.

The novel was released under the imprint Outside Reading  with three accompanying CDs, The Ram, The Wolves, and Animus, featuring musicians including Jim Keltner, James "Hutch" Hutchinson, Charles Bissell, Marc Ribot, and Iva Bittová, with art by François Burland and Adde Russell.

Reception was mixed, with Publishers Weekly praising Shapero’s “vivid imagery,” while others have called it “bizarre.” It was promoted with a 13-city book tour across America and an advance printing of 50,000 copies.

Too Far

Too Far is Shapero’s second novel, published in 2010. It tells the story of Robbie and Fristeen, two six-year-old children who explore the forest outside their home during a tumultuous time in their families. The story was partially inspired by his young daughter’s interest in the fantasy genre, and Shapero incorporated her ideas on character development into the final draft. Shapero’s daughter also created the title font for the cover and some interior graphics.

The CD component, Dawn Remembers, features musicians including Maria Taylor (Azure Ray), Andy LeMaster (Bright Eyes), Joe Gore (PJ Harvey, Tom Waits), Marc Ribot (Tom Waits), Eric Drew Feldman (Captain Beefheart/PJ Harvey). The art was by Eugene Von Bruenchenhein. Though Von Bruenchenhein passed in 1983, Shapero collects his paintings and displays them in an online gallery. He used works from his estate to complete Too Far and other novels, saying the paintings “... seemed to carry with them a complex history, as if they were glimpses of a world distant from our own.” 

The Hope We Seek

The Hope We Seek was released in 2014 and follows the story of “Zachary Knox, a sharpshooter known as ‘the Bull's-Eye Telepath,’ [as he] heads north in search of gold. On his way he meets Sephy, a magnetic woman on the trail of her lost brother. But on arrival, they find the mining camp is home to a cult.” The novel deals with “the extremes to which we go to find meaning in our lives.”

The accompanying music for the novel was released on the album Songs from the Big Wheel on the label Outside Reading. The songs are performed by Marissa Nadler and accompanied by Marc Ribot, Robert Powell, Andy LeMaster, Joe Gore and Son of Dave with Shapero on acoustic guitar and mandola. The art for The Hope We Seek was created by Donald Pass. The app version of The Hope We Seek won the 2015 Digital Book World Award for Best Adult Fiction App.

Arms from the Sea

Arms from the Sea is the story of “Lyle [...] a young man who hates his life in the State of Salt, a cultural and literal desert. He vandalizes a State icon, then swallows a poison pill that transports him not to death, but to a liminal realm—blue, aquatic, and wholly alien”. The novel deals with themes of creativity and change through the metaphor of the Polyp, a god-like entity. The novel was described as “a tangible encounter with the creative spirit.” by Moses Hacmon.

The visual art for Arms from the Sea was by Eugene Von Bruenchenhein. Unlike with previous stories, the music was a collaboration and not solely produced by Shapero. Orenda Fink was brought on board to write the music, Shapero provided lyrics and Fink contributed vocals.

Rin, Tongue and Dorner

Rin, Tongue and Dorner was released on July 19, 2018. The plot "imagines a future in which humans are driven by the encroaching glaciers of a new ice age to live in a weather dome, "Clemency," where citizens are encouraged to regulate "temp"—both temperament and temperature—for the sake of the colony’s survival.” The central conflict of Rin, Tongue and Dorner is the suppression of internal desires for the greater community and the internal cost of those choices.

The art was once again by Eugene Von Bruenchenhein but Shapero went with new collaborators for the music. Montreal-based band Elsiane was brought in for the album, with the vocals of Elsieanne Caplette used to portray “Tongue,” a character described as “a weaving chorus of beckoning, provocative voices inside Dorner’s head.”

Balcony of Fog

Balcony of Fog (2020) is about a post apocalyptic time where a person wakes up from a beating to discover himself being tended to by a woman from the clouds. He follows her into the clouds to escape from his life of endless labor as a "toiler."

Dreams of Delphine

Dreams of Delphine (2022) is a novel about a grieving person's dreams of the deceased.

References

External links 

TooFar Media
Rich Shapero Official Website

1948 births
Living people
American financiers
Businesspeople from Los Angeles
University of California, Berkeley alumni
Self-published books